Scholder is a surname. Notable people with the surname include:

Fritz Scholder (1937–2005), Native American artist
Klaus Scholder (1930–1985), German ecclesiastical historian

See also
Schöler